Keiffer is a given name. Notable people with the name include:

Keiffer Hubbell (born 1989), American ice dancer
Keiffer J. Mitchell Jr. (born 1967), American politician

See also
Keffer